The Trenton Handicap was an American Thoroughbred horse race run annually at Garden State Park Racetrack in Cherry Hill, New Jersey. Open to horses age three and older, the race was contested on dirt at various distances during its tenure:
  miles (9 furlongs) : 1942-1953, 1990–1996
  miles (10 furlongs) : 1954-1971, 1974, 1989
  miles (8.5 furlongs) : 1973

The race was part of the inaugural season at Garden State Park Racetrack which opened for business on July 18, 1942. That year's winner was Calumet Farm's 1941 U.S. Triple Crown winner, Whirlaway. In its heyday, Garden State Park Racetrack attracted racing's top stars and as many as 40,000 fans for big races such as the Trenton Handicap.

In 1957, the event was contested between just three horses. Bold Ruler, Gallant Man and Round Table were led to the post on 11/9/57. Bold Ruler went wire to wire on an "off' track and was named U.S. 3-Yr-Old Champion Male (1957) and DRF/TSD U.S. Horse of the Year (1957).

There was no Trenton Handicap from 1977 through 1984 after a fire destroyed the Garden State Park Racetrack grandstand. The business did not reopen until new owners rebuilt the facility in 1984.

There was another Trenton Handicap which was run at Havre de Grace Racetrack.

Records
Speed record:
 2:00.00 - Mongo (1962) (race and track record for  miles)

Most wins:
 3 - Mr. Right (1967, 1968, 1969)

Winners

1996 - Relentless Star
1995 - Poor But Honest
1994 - Double Calvados
1993 - Dr. Zoom
1992 - Fiftysevenvette
1991 - Killer Diller
1990 - Wind Splitter
1989 - Intensive Command
1988 - Manzotti
1987 - Broad Brush
1986 - Land Of Believe
1985 - Dr. Carter
1984-1977 - Race not Run
1976 - Royal Glint
1975 - Mongongo
1974 - True Knight
1973 - Mr. Correlation
1972 - Triangular
1971 - Tinajero
1970 - Ship Leave
1969 - Mr. Right
1968 - Mr. Right
1967 - Mr. Right
1966 - Handsome Boy
1965 - Slystitch
1964 - Mongo
1963 - Carry Back
1962 - Mongo
1961 - Carry Back
1960 - Manassa Mauler
1959 - Greek Star
1958 - Vertex
1957 - Bold Ruler
1956 - Bardstown
1955 - Social Outcast
1954 - Helioscope
1953 - Olympic
1952 - Ken
1951 - Call Over
1950 - Chicle
1949 - Sky Miracle
1948 - Double Jay
1947 - Cosmic Bomb
1946 - Turbine
1945 - First Fiddle
1944 - Bon Jour
1943 - Aonbarr
1942 - Whirlaway

References

Discontinued horse races in the United States
Horse races in New Jersey
Garden State Park Racetrack
1942 establishments in New Jersey
1996 disestablishments in New Jersey
Recurring sporting events established in 1942
Recurring sporting events disestablished in 1996